Vechta (Northern Low Saxon: Vechte) is the capital and largest city of the Vechta district in Lower Saxony, Germany. It is home to the University of Vechta.

It is known for the 'Stoppelmarkt' fair, which takes place every summer and has a history dating back to 1298. With an attendance of 800,000 visitors it is one of the biggest annual fairs in north-western Germany.

In the recent past, the town was known as a centre of far-northern German Catholicism.

Town subdivisions 

Vechta consists of the following 15 boroughs.

Transport and infrastructure
The A1, also known as the Hansalinie, passes by Vechta. There are three interchanges: Vechta-West/Bakum, Vechta-Langförden/Emstek, Vechta-Nord/Ahlhorn . Also, the B69 runs through the city of Vechta.

Transport 

Vechta lies on the Delmenhorst-Hesepe railway and offers connections to Osnabrück and Bremen.

Population development 

Vechta has become a very rich city with a high quality of living, so Vechta is one of the rare German towns that still has a growing population.

Theatre

Vechta is a fixed venue for the Landesbühne Niedersachsen Nord, founded in 1952. The headquarter is located in Wilhelmshaven, which stages annually up to ten performances at the Metropoltheater. The theatre offers 272 seats.

Stoppelmarkt

Stoppelmarkt was first mentioned as a market in 1298. In earlier times, it was held in the streets of the city within the fortress walls. Even then, merchants from many European countries came to Vechta. In 1577 the city of Vechta was hit by the plague. Therefore, the market had to be moved to an open field outside the city walls. Since the stubble remains of the last harvest were still standing on the field, the market was henceforth called Stoppelmarkt. In 2020 and 2021 the market was cancelled because of the COVID-19 pandemic.

Climate
The climate in Vechta is a moderate sea climate, influenced by wet northwest winds from the North Sea. The long term average air temperature reaches 8.5 to 9.0 °C and about 700 millimeters of rainfall per year. Between May and August, an average of 20–25 summer days (climatological term for days with the maximum temperature exceeds 25 °C) are calculated.

Twin towns – sister cities

Vechta is twinned with:
 Le Cellier, France
 Jászberény, Hungary
 Saint-Pol-de-Léon, France

Sport
Vechta is the home of the Rasta Vechta basketball club, which plays in the German Basketball Bundesliga.

Notable people

Andreas Romberg (1767–1821), composer and violin player
Rolf Dieter Brinkmann (1940–1975), lyrician
Ansgar Brinkmann (born 1969), footballer
Martin Welzel (born 1972), musician, associate organist at Munich Cathedral 2021–2022
Katja Suding (born 1975), politician
Alparslan Erdem (born 1988), footballer

See also
University of Vechta

References

External links

 Official site 

Vechta (district)